Andrew Wilder (born July 5, 1990) is a former gridiron football punter who played for the Ottawa Redblacks of the Canadian Football League (CFL) in 2015. He played college football at Northern Arizona.

Professional career

Tampa Bay Buccaneers
Wilder was signed by the Tampa Bay Buccaneers on March 20, 2015.

References

External links
Tampa Bay Buccaneers bio
JustSportsStats.com bio

1990 births
Living people
Players of American football from Arizona
American football punters
Tampa Bay Buccaneers players
Ottawa Redblacks players